Andrew Lloyd Webber's Cinderella, produced on Broadway as Bad Cinderella, is a stage musical with music by Andrew Lloyd Webber, lyrics by David Zippel, and a book by Emerald Fennell. Loosely adapted from the classic story of the same name, plot changes include recast gender relationships and thematic exploration of beauty shaming. Cinderella changes her appearance to secure love, but discovers it is better to be true to oneself.

After beginning West End previews in June 2021, London performances were suspended due to the COVID-19 pandemic; the show ultimately opened in August 2021 and ran until June 2022. A Broadway transfer retitled Bad Cinderella began preview performances in February 2023 and is scheduled to open the following month.

Synopsis

Act 1
The town of Belleville, France, full of beautiful inhabitants, prepares to be awarded "Most Attractive Town" for the 50th year. The Queen's beloved, flawless, firstborn son, Prince Charming, has died in battle against a dragon; his younger brother, Prince Sebastian, is shy and gawky. The Queen builds a memorial statue in honor of Charming and the 50th year. At the award ceremony, the statue is presented but has been vandalised, causing Belleville to lose the prize and breaking their winning streak ("Buns 'N' Roses"). The townspeople blame the local misfit, Cinderella, a rebellious, goth, loud-mouthed maid ("It Has to Be Her"). They gag her and tie her to a tree in the woods ("Bad Cinderella"). Prince Sebastian, Cinderella’s only childhood friend, arrives to rescue her and teases her for getting tied to a tree again. They catch up and discuss Sebastian’s new status as heir to the throne, and Cinderella's hard childhood after her parents' deaths. After Cinderella leaves, Sebastian reveals that he secretly loves and misses her ("So Long").

At home, Cinderella's vain stepsisters, Adele and Marie, quarrel and complain that Cinderella makes their lives difficult; the Stepmother threatens to kick her out of the house if she causes any more trouble ("Unfair"). Cinderella hopes one day to run away from Belleville, but she stays because she loves Sebastian, though she feels unworthy of him ("Unbreakable"). Meanwhile, Sebastian goes to the Hunks' Gymnasium for his workout ("Hunks' Song"). In panic about the town losing the prize, the Queen decides that, to save the town's reputation, she must throw a Royal Ball on Saturday, inviting every girl in the kingdom; there Sebastian must choose a bride. She dismisses his objections and compares him unfavourably to Charming ("Man’s Man").

In the town square, Sebastian tells Cinderella about the royal wedding and blames her for it. They argue, but Sebastian asks her to be at the Ball ("So Long" (reprise)). Sebastian wonders why he cannot tell Cinderella his true feelings ("Only You, Lonely You"). At the Palace, the Stepmother visits the Queen, and they recall their youth ("I Know You"). The Stepmother arranges to have either of her daughters marry Sebastian ("I Know You" (reprise)). Soon everyone in Belleville is on a shopping spree in the town square to prepare for the Ball. Sebastian gains popularity with the local girls. He sees Cinderella and again asks that she attend the Ball. The Stepmother suggests that Sebastian only invited her out of pity because of her dull looks ("The Village Square").

Later, the Stepmother and stepsisters prepare for the Ball. As Cinderella assists them, they mockingly insist that Sebastian could never choose her ("Unfair" (reprise)). Determined to go to the Ball, Cinderella visits the Godmother, a plastic surgeon, who has made the townsfolk look perfect ("The Godmother's Shop"). In exchange for Cinderella's mother's necklace, the Godmother provides a temporary cosmetic surgery make-over, with a beautiful gown and shoes made of crystal ("Beauty Has a Price"). She tells Cinderella that the pain of maintaining the look will be bearable only until midnight.

Act 2
At the Ball ("The Cinderella Waltz"/"The Ball"), Prince Sebastian is annoyed by his suitresses and is anxious, as he must choose a bride by midnight. Cinderella arrives, magnificent but unrecognised. The Queen forces Sebastian to dance with her. Cinderella confesses that she is in love with him, but Sebastian tells her that he is waiting for someone. Cinderella becomes progressively more uncomfortable in her tight shoes. The Stepmother and Stepsisters soon recognize her, as Cinderella cannot walk in heels. The Stepmother forces Adele to kiss Sebastian at the stroke of midnight. She does so, and the Queen declares her Sebastian's bride. Sebastian finally recognises Cinderella, but she dismisses him, heartbroken. She rips her dress and wig off ("I Know I Have a Heart"). Sebastian is anguished that he hurt Cinderella. The Hunks mock-congratulate him ("Act 2, Scene 2"). In frustration, he defends himself and begins to act like a prince ("I Am No Longer Me").

At home, the Stepmother gloats over Adele's engagement as they prepare for the wedding. Marie is jealous ("Moment of Triumph"). The Stepmother mocks Cinderella for failing to see that Sebastian loves her ("What Were You Thinking?"). Cinderella despairs that she has lost her only best friend/love ("Far Too Late"). She starts packing her things to leave Belleville, but Marie encourages her to stop Sebastian and Adele's wedding, and tell Sebastian how she really feels ("Ego Has a Price" (reprise of "Beauty Has a Price")).

At the wedding ("The Wedding March"/"The Ceremony"), when the preacher asks for objections, Prince Charming (everyone is delighted to see him alive) stops the wedding to save Sebastian. To prevent his own arranged marriage, he faked his death and has returned to marry the love of his life. He comes out as gay and introduces his fiancé, the Duc de Violette ("Man's Man" (reprise)). While the Stepmother is devastated as her plan unravels, the Queen is overjoyed, since this marriage will return Belleville to splendour. She declares that henceforth Belleville will be the city of love; everyone in Belleville cheers for the new Kings ("Marry for Love"), as the wedding bells ring out. Cinderella hears the bells and thinks that Sebastian is married. Shattered, she finishes packing and heads out of Belleville ("Cinderella’s Soliloquy").

At the Palace, Prince Charming and his new husband celebrate a lavish wedding reception, but Sebastian is miserable. Marie tells him about Cinderella's plan to stop his wedding. Realising that she plans to leave town, he decides to go after Cinderella. The Stepmother accuses the Queen of breaching their deal, but the Queen threatens to execute the Stepmother and throws her out of the Palace ("The Wedding Party"). Sebastian sees that the Godmother has Cinderella's mother's necklace, and the Godmother gives it to him. Sebastian arrives at Cinderella's home to find only her crystal slippers. Luckily, Cinderella returns for the slippers (to sell them). Sebastian returns her necklace and tells her what happened; they both realise the error of their previous changes, and Sebastian decides to run away with Cinderella. They share a tender kiss (Finale).

Musical numbers 

Act 1
 "Buns 'n' Roses" – Townspeople, The Queen
 "It Has to Be Her" – Townspeople
 "Bad Cinderella" – Cinderella
 "So Long" – Sebastian, Cinderella
 "Unfair – Adele, Marie, The Stepmother
 "Unbreakable" – Cinderella
 "Hunks Song" – Hunks
 "Man's Man" – The Queen, Hunks
 "So Long" (reprise) – Cinderella, Prince Sebastian
 "Only You, Lonely You" – Sebastian
 "I Know You" – The Stepmother and The Queen
 "I Know You" (reprise) – The Queen, The Stepmother
 "The Village Square" – Townspeople, Hunks, The Stepmother
 "Unfair" (reprise) – Cinderella, The Stepmother, Adele, Marie
 "The Godmother's Shop" – Cinderella, Godmother 
 "Beauty Has a Price" – Cinderella, Godmother 

 
Act 2
 "Entr’acte" – Orchestra
 "Fanfare" – Orchestra 
 "The Cinderella Waltz" – Orchestra
 "The Ball" – Sebastian, The Queen, Cinderella, The Stepmother 
 "I Know I Have a Heart" – Cinderella
 "Act 2, Scene 2" – Sebastian, Hunks
 "I Am No Longer Me" – Sebastian, The Queen
 "Moment of Triumph" – The Stepmother, Adele, Marie
 "What Were You Thinking? – The Stepmother, Cinderella
 "Far Too Late" – Cinderella
 "Ego Has a Price" – Marie
 "The Wedding March" – Orchestra
 "Man's Man" (reprise) – Prince Charming
 "Marry for Love" – Charming, Hunks, The Queen, Guests
 "Cinderella's Soliloquy" – Cinderella 
 "The Wedding Party – Hunks, Guests Sebastian, Queen, Stepmother, Marie
 Finale – Sebastian, Cinderella.

Productions

West End 
The musical was workshopped at The Other Palace in London in May 2019 with Carrie Hope Fletcher in the title role, Tyrone Huntley as Prince Sebastian and Victoria Hamilton-Barritt as the Stepmother. The cast also included Rebecca Trehearn as Marie, Gary Wilmot as Jean, Ruthie Henshall as The Queen and Jonny Fines as Prince Charming.

Cinderella began previews at 50% capacity on 25 June 2021 at the Gillian Lynne Theatre in London's West End. The opening, originally scheduled for August 2020, was delayed due to the COVID-19 pandemic. After beginning previews the production was scheduled to open on 20 July, but on 18 July a cast member tested positive for Covid-19; performances were suspended, and the official opening was postponed again. Performances resumed with an official opening on 18 August.

The production was directed by Laurence Connor and choreographed by JoAnn M. Hunter, with set and costume design by Gabriela Tylesova, sound design by Gareth Owen and lighting by Bruno Poet. Fletcher and Hamilton-Barrit created the roles of Cinderella and the Stepmother, with Trehearn as The Queen (instead of her workshop role). Ivano Turco created the role of Prince Sebastian.

Some of the cast and crew members who were not present at the matinee on 1 May 2022 were not informed of the show's closure before it was publicly announced, leading to criticism and protests. The production closed on 12 June 2022 after a 12-month run. Lloyd Webber received further criticism when he referred to the show as a "costly mistake". He later clarified: "I am very sorry if my words have been misunderstood. ... I am incredibly, incredibly proud of Cinderella ... the mistake we made was trying to open too early, meaning we had to postpone twice. Everything we did was to try and support the West End and get everyone back to work after the [pandemic]."

Broadway
A Broadway production of the musical, with Linedy Genao as the title character, under the new title Bad Cinderella, began previews at the Imperial Theatre on 17 February 2023 with an official opening set for 23 March 2023. Lloyd Webber said that the run introduces some new songs. Connor and Hunter direct and choreograph the production. Revisions to the book were written by Alexis Scheer, and the London design team also designed the Broadway production. A single of Genao's version of the title song ("Bad Cinderella") was released to streaming platforms in October 2022. The cast also includes Jordan Dobson as Prince Sebastian, Grace McLean as the Queen, Carolee Carmello as the Stepmother, Sami Gayle as Adele and Morgan Higgins as Marie. Christina Acosta Robinson plays the Godmother, and Savy Jackson is the title role's alternate. Another single, "I Know I Have a Heart (Because You Broke It)", was released on 10 February 2023.

Cast and characters

Reception
In his 5-star review in The Guardian, Chris Wiegand wrote:

Wiegand thought Fletcher and Turco "equally excellent", called Onitiri "fantastic", and praised Trehearn, the principals generally, the designs and the choreography. He concludes, "It adds up to not so much a ball as a blast: terrifically OTT and silly but warm and inclusive, with relatable, down-to-earth heroes and pertinent points about our quest for perfection and our expectations of each other and ourselves." 

The Times, The Telegraph, The New York Times and most other reviews also commented positively, but Johnny Oleksinski, writing in the New York Post, had a mixed reaction. Although he liked the cast and Lloyd-Webber's score, he bemoaned the show’s "joylessness", criticizing the book and direction, and suggesting that the "plodding" production be cut by half an hour.

Concept album
A concept album of the show was released on 9 July 2021 on Polydor Records, featuring Fletcher, Turco, Hamilton-Barritt and special guests including Adam Lambert as Prince Charming, Helen George as The Queen, cameo appearances of Sarah Brightman and Emerald Fennell, and a bonus track version of "Only You, Lonely You" performed by Todrick Hall. The recording also includes the song "The Vanquishing of the Three-Headed Sea Witch", performed by Lambert as Prince Charming, which was cut from the original production. The album does not include the Entr'acte at the start of Act 2 (a reprise of the musical themes from the first act), or the Bows section after the finale (a musical reprise of The Wedding Party/Bad Cinderella/I Know I Have a Heart).

It was nominated for the Grammy Award for Best Musical Theater Album.

Awards and nominations

Original London Production

References

External links 
 

West End musicals
Musicals by Andrew Lloyd Webber
Musicals by David Zippel
Works based on Cinderella
Musicals based on works by Charles Perrault
Plays based on fairy tales
2021 musicals